Defender Photo Supply was an early leader in manufacturing of black & white sheet film, plates, printing paper, and instructional books. Incorporated in 1899 in Rochester, New York, it was purchased by DuPont in 1945. A branch of the company, The Defender Dry Plate Company, was located in Wayne Junction, Germantown, Philadelphia, PA. The two company branches issued combined trade catalogs.

Achievements

Defendol - an affordable developing agent created to sidestep developers controlled by German patents
Chromatone Process - Introduced in 1935, is a method of using a collodion stripping paper manufactured by the Defender Company andm tricolor toners developed by Francis H. Snyder and Henry W. Rimbach of New York City.
VC Paper

References

Photography companies of the United States
Defunct companies based in New York (state)